Melica mollis is a species of grass endemic to Chile where it grows in rock crevices at  above sea level.

Description
The leaf-sheaths are tubular and are closed on one end with its surface being glabrous. The surface is pubescent and is hairy as well. The main branches of the panicle are appressed and pilose axis.

Spikelets are elliptic, solitary, are the same size as panicle and are pediceled. The pedicels are ciliate, curved, filiform, and hairy. Besides the pedicels, the spikelets have 2 fertile florets which are diminished at the apex and have pubescent callus as well. Both the upper and lower glumes are hairy on the bottom, keelless, membranous, ovate and have puberulous surfaces.

Lemma have ciliated margins, dentated apex, and the same surface as the glumes. Palea have ciliolated keels, is hairy, and is 2-veined with the surface that is identical to the chaffs and lemma. The fruits have caryopsis, are dark brown in colour with additional pericarp and linear hilum.

Ecology
Melica mollis blooms from September to November from Huasco to Atacama provinces.

References

mollis
Endemic flora of Chile
Flora of South America